Live for Life is a 1967 French film directed by Claude Lelouch starring Yves Montand, Candice Bergen and Annie Girardot. The film won the Golden Globe for Best Foreign Language Film and was nominated for the Academy Award for Best Foreign Language Film. The film had a total of 2,936,035 admissions in France and was the 7th highest-grossing film of the year.

Plot
Robert Colomb (Yves Montand) is a famous TV newscaster, married to Catherine (Annie Girardot), but continually unfaithful to her. Then he meets, and becomes fascinated with Candice (Candice Bergen). He takes her along on an assignment in Kenya and later establishes an "arrangement" with her in Amsterdam.

He is then assigned to Vietnam, tells Candice their affair is over and discovers that is more than acceptable to her as she is tired of him. Returning from a Vietnamese prison, he decides to return to Catherine, but discovers she has made a new life for herself.

Cast
 Yves Montand as Robert Colomb
 Candice Bergen as Candice
 Annie Girardot as Catherine Colomb
 Irène Tunc as Mireille
 Anouk Ferjac as Jacqueline
 Uta Taeger as Lucie/maid
 Jean Collomb as Waiter
 Michel Parbot as Michel
 Amidou as Photographer
 Jacques Portet as Candice's friend/photographer

See also
 List of submissions to the 40th Academy Awards for Best Foreign Language Film
 List of French submissions for the Academy Award for Best Foreign Language Film

References

External links 
 
 

1967 films
1967 romantic drama films
French romantic drama films
1960s French-language films
Films directed by Claude Lelouch
United Artists films
Films scored by Francis Lai
Best Foreign Language Film Golden Globe winners
1960s French films